Rodallega is a surname. Notable people with the surname include:

 Carmen Rodallega (born 1983), Colombian footballer
 Hugo Rodallega (born 1985), Colombian footballer
 Robert Rodallega (born 1969), Venezuelan footballer

Spanish-language surnames